The 2011–12 West Coast Conference women's basketball season began with practices in October 2011 and ended with the 2012 West Coast Conference women's basketball tournament from February 29- March 5, 2012 at the Orleans Arena in Las Vegas. The regular season began on the weekend of November 11, with the conference schedule starting on December 29.

This was the 27th season for WCC women's basketball, which began in the 1985–86 season when the league was known as the West Coast Athletic Conference (WCAC). It was also the 22nd season under the West Coast Conference name (the conference began as the California Basketball Association in 1952, became the WCAC in 1956, and dropped the word "Athletic" in 1989). In July 2011, a new faith based, private school joined the conference. BYU came from the Mountain West, marking the WCC's first change in membership since 1980.

Pre-season
 Pre-season media day was held on October 27, 2011, at YouTube's headquarters in San Bruno, California.
 2011–12 West Coast Women's Basketball Media Poll:
Rank, School (first-place votes), Points
1. Gonzaga University (8), 64
2. Brigham Young University (1), 52
3. Pepperdine University, 50
4. Loyola Marymount University, 36
5. Saint Mary's College, 34
6. University of Portland, 32
7. University of San Diego, 26
8. Santa Clara University, 22
9. University of San Francisco, 8

 2011–12 West Coast Women's Preseason All-West Conference Team:
Player, School, Yr., Pos.
Dominique Conners, USD, Sr., G
Alex Cowling, Loyola Marymount, RS-Jr., G/F
Natalie Day, Portland, Sr.., G/F
Jazmine Jackson, Pepperdine, Sr., G
Katelan Redmon, Gonzaga, Sr., G/F
Kristen Riley, Brigham Young University, Sr., F
Alyssa Shoji, Santa Clara, Sr., G
Jasmine Smith, Saint Mary's, RS-Sr., G
Kayla Standish, Gonzaga, Sr., F
ReZina TecleMariam , Portland, Sr., G

Rankings

Non-Conference games
 BYU would lose to #8 Duke 61–55 on November 11, 2011.

Conference games
2 Conference Games would be shown nationally on CBS Sports Network- Portland at San Diego on January 19, 2012, and Loyola Marymount at Gonzaga on January 26, 2012.
BYUtv would show all home BYU games except for the Saint Mary's game on February 4, 2012.
SWX Right Now would show all Gonzaga home games except for the game shown nationally on CBS Sports Network.
In Week 11 the WCC had two teams rank in the Top 25 for the first time in the conference's history with BYU and Gonzaga both claiming Top 25 spots.

Composite Matrix
This table summarizes the head-to-head results between teams in conference play. (x) indicates games remaining this season.

Conference tournament

 February 29- March 5, 2012 – West Coast Conference Basketball Tournament, Orleans Arena, Las Vegas, NV.

Head coaches
Jeff Judkins, BYU
Kelly Graves, Gonzaga
Julie Wilhoit, Loyola Marymount
Julie Rousseau, Pepperdine
Jim Sollars, Portland
Paul Thomas, Saint Mary's
Cindy Fisher, San Diego
Jennifer Azzi, San Francisco
Jennifer Mountain, Santa Clara

Post-season

NCAA tournament
Gonzaga was an 11-seed. They advanced to the Sweet Sixteen after winning the 1st and 2nd Round games on their home court.
BYU was a 10-seed. They lost in the first round against DePaul on the DePaul men's team home court.

WNIT
 San Diego was granted the WCC's automatic bid to the WNIT after Gonzaga was taken as an at large team. They played into the semifinals on the WNIT before they were finally defeated at Oklahoma State. USD won 2 road games to make the semifinals of the WNIT- at Texas Tech in the regional semi's and then at Washington in the regional final. 
 Saint Mary's was taken as an at-large selection. They defeated UNLV in the first round before losing at Oregon State. Oregon State would lose in the next round to Washington who was eliminated by fellow WCC school San Diego in the quarterfinals.

WBI
 No WCC school qualified for the WBI.

Highlights and notes

Awards and honors

Primetime Performers Honor Roll by Collegesports360.com
 Haiden Palmer, Gonzaga, Week of Dec 19-25 
 Alex Carbonel, Saint Mary's, Week of Jan 9-15
 Taelor Karr, Gonzaga, Week of Jan 23-29
 Jennifer Hamson, BYU, Week of Feb 6-12

Scholar-Athlete of the Year

Player-of-the-Week

 Nov. 14 – Natalie Day, Portland
 Nov. 28 – Natalie Day, Portland
 Dec. 12 – Alex Cowling, Loyola Marymount
 Dec. 26 – Jasmine Smith, Saint Mary's
 Jan. 9 – Dominique Conners, San Diego
 Jan. 23 – Katelan Redmon, Gonzaga
 Feb. 6 – Lauren Bell, Pepperdine
 Feb. 20 – Kelly Bowen, Gonzaga
 Nov. 21 – Natalie Day, Portland
 Dec. 5 – Kim Parker, BYU
 Dec. 19 – Haiden Palmer, Gonzaga
 Jan. 2 – Morgan Woodrow, San Diego
 Jan. 16 – Alex Carbonel, Saint Mary's
 Jan. 30 – Kristen Riley, BYU
 Feb. 13 – Kim Parker, BYU
 Feb. 27 – Katelan Redmon, Gonzaga

Player-of-the-Month
 November – Natalie Day, Portland
 December – Alex Cowling, Loyola Marymount
 January – Kristen Riley, BYU
 February – Kristen Riley, BYU

All-Americans

All West Coast Conference teams
Voting was by conference coaches:
Player of The Year: Kristen Riley, BYU
Co-Newcomer of The Year: Lexi Eaton, BYU
Co-Newcomer of the Year: Haiden Palmer, Gonzaga
Defensive Player of The Year: Jazmine Jackson, Pepperdine
Coach of The Year: Cindy Fisher, San Diego

All-Conference team

Honorable mention

All-Freshman team

All Academic team

See also
2011-12 NCAA Division I men's basketball season
West Coast Conference men's basketball tournament
2011–12 West Coast Conference men's basketball season
West Coast Conference women's basketball tournament
2012 West Coast Conference women's basketball tournament

References